Top Dog is a crime drama film directed by Martin Kemp and starring Leo Gregory, Vincent Regan and Ricci Harnett. It is based on the novel written by Dougie Brimson, who also penned the screenplay.

Premise
A hooligan boss Billy Evans (Leo Gregory) feuds with gangster Mickey (Ricci Harnett) over a backstreet protection racket and quickly finds himself out of his depth as events rapidly escalate and he finds that he has taken on far more than he can handle.

Cast
Leo Gregory as Billy Evans
Ricci Harnett as Mickey
Vincent Regan as Mr Watson
George Russo as Hawk
Dannielle Brent as Sam
Jason Flemyng as Dan
Lorraine Stanley as Julie
Susan Penhaligon as Sal
George Sweeney as Steve

Release

The film was released on DVD on 1 June 2014.

References

External links
 
 

2014 films
2014 crime drama films
British crime drama films
Films set in London
2010s English-language films
2010s British films